A commercial driver's license (CDL) is a driver's license required in the United States to operate large and heavy vehicles (including trucks, buses, and trailers) or a vehicle of any size that transports hazardous materials or more than 15 passengers (including the driver).

United States
In the United States, the Commercial Motor Vehicle Safety Act of 1986 established minimum requirements that must be met when a state issues a CDL. While recreational vehicles and farm vehicles are exempt from requiring a CDL, federal law allows states to require a CDL for these vehicles. However, such vehicles are federally exempt from having to obtain a CDL. The following types of CDL licenses are:

Class A – Any combination of vehicles that has a gross combination weight rating or gross combination weight of 26,001 pounds (11,794 kilograms) or more inclusive of a towed unit(s) with a gross vehicle weight rating or gross vehicle weight of more than 10,000 pounds (4,536 kilograms). 
Class B – Any single vehicle which has a gross vehicle weight rating or gross vehicle weight of 26,001 pounds (11,794 kilograms) or more, or any such vehicle towing a vehicle with a gross vehicle weight rating or gross vehicle weight that does not exceed 10,000 pounds (4,536 kilograms). 
Class C – Any single vehicle, or combination of vehicles, that does not meet the definition of Class A or Class B, but is either designed to transport 16 or more passengers, including the driver or is transporting material that has been designated as hazardous under 49 U.S.C. 5103 and is required to be placarded under subpart F of 49 CFR Part 172 or is transporting any quantity of a material listed as a select agent or toxin in 42 CFR Part 73.

Age requirements
The minimum age for a CDL is determined by state governments. All states, as well as the District of Columbia, have made 18 the minimum age for a CDL to be issued with the exception of Hawaii where the minimum age is 21.

The Federal Motor Carrier Safety Administration (FMCSA) requires drivers to be 21 years or over to drive a commercial vehicle in interstate commerce (to move goods across state lines) and transport hazardous materials when placards are required. The FMCSA allows states to issue a CDL to drivers under 21 providing they only drive a commercial vehicle within the state where the CDL was issued, i.e. intrastate commerce. Additional age restrictions vary by state law. For example, New Jersey requires drivers to be at least 21 years of age for a passenger endorsement. 

On 15 November 2021, New York Governor Kathy Hochul signed legislation to lower the minimum age for a CDL Class A from 21 to 18. Previously, New York State only allowed 18 to 20-year-olds to apply for a CDL Class B or C, but not for a CDL Class A until they turn 21. 

The Infrastructure Investment and Jobs Act signed into law on 15 November 2021 by President Joe Biden established the "safe driver apprenticeship pilot program" that would allow qualified 18 to 20-year-olds with a CDL to operate in interstate commerce after successful completion of supervised training with an older and experienced driver. This program aims to help alleviate the national truck driver shortage by removing the barrier for 18, 19, and 20-year-olds to become professional bus and truck drivers by exempting them from the age requirement for interstate commerce provided they meet all other requirements as drivers age 21 and over.

Regulation changes
Before 1992, driving commercial motor vehicles (CMVs), which are primarily tractor-trailers (or Longer Combination Vehicles (LCVs)), required advanced skills and knowledge above and beyond those required to drive a car or other lightweight vehicle. Before the implementation of the commercial driver's license (CDL) in 1992, licensing requirements for driving larger vehicles and buses varied from state to state.

This lack of training resulted in a large number of preventable traffic deaths and accidents.

In 1992, when the Act became law, all drivers were required to have a CDL in order to drive a Commercial Motor Vehicle. The Federal Highway Administration (FHWA) has developed testing standards for licensing drivers. U.S. states are able to issue CDLs only after a written and practical test have been given by the State or approved testing facility. A driver needs a CDL if the vehicle meets one of the definitions of a Commercial Motor Vehicle (CMV) listed above.

A state may also require a driver to have a CDL to operate certain other vehicles. For example, a driver licensed in New Jersey must have a CDL to drive a bus, limousine, or van that is used for hire and designed to transport 8 to 15 passengers. A driver licensed in New York must have a CDL to legally transport passengers in school buses and other vehicles listed in Article 19-A of the state's Vehicle and Traffic Law. Drivers licensed in California must have a CDL if their primary employment is driving, whether or not they actually drive a commercial vehicle. California defines a commercial vehicle as one that transports for hire either people or products. In addition, possession of a CDL in California changes the threshold for a Driving Under the Influence citation from 0.08% to 0.04% blood alcohol content.

Prospective licensees should verify CDL requirements by referencing their state specific CDL Manual.

In most states, a driver's license (for cars) is required before a Commercial Driver's License can be issued.

Endorsements
The following endorsements listed are federal-level endorsements. States are free to enact endorsements at the state level. For example, in New York State, a W endorsement is required to operate a tow truck.

Endorsements without codes
These are optional endorsements that do not carry an endorsement code, but may be required for certain CDL holders:

Restrictions
M, X, E, K, L, V, N, O, and Z are federal restrictions. Any other restrictions have been promulgated at the state level.

Training 
Educational prerequisites vary by state. Some states, such as Ohio, for example require 160 hours of classroom and on the road training. Training may be obtained by completing a qualified CDL training program through a DMV-approved truck driving school. These training programs specialize in teaching potential truck drivers the necessary skills and knowledge to properly and safely operate a truck, including map reading, trip planning, and compliance with U.S. Department of Transportation laws, as well as backing, turning, hooking a trailer, and road driving. The overall purpose of these training schools is to help truckers-to-be pass the CDL knowledge and skills tests as well as advanced driving techniques such as skid avoidance and recovery and other emergency actions for situations such as a breakaway trailer and hydroplaning.  These classes usually go well beyond the training the typical non-commercial driver receives, such as the driver's education provided in high school. There are a number of licensed CDL training schools around the United States and many trucking companies operate their own schools as well.

Testing
Although each state may add additional restrictions, there are national requirements which are as follows. A prospective driver must pass a series of written exams for a learner permit, or to add endorsements. The General Knowledge Test, required for a commercial learner permit, consists of 50 questions, where 80 percent of questions must be answered correctly to pass.

The CDL Skills Test must be passed for the applicant to obtain their CDL license. It includes three different sections:
The first is the Pre-Trip Inspection where the applicant must inspect their vehicle what they would inspect and why.
The second is a written test on highway safety and a test about different parts of a truck with a minimum of 30 questions on the test. To pass this knowledge test, student drivers must answer at least 80 percent of the questions correctly.
The third is a driving skills test. To pass the driving skills test, the student driver must successfully perform a set of required driving maneuvers. The driving skill test must be taken in a vehicle that the driver operates or expects to operate.  For certain endorsements, such as air (pneumatic) brakes, the driving skills test must be taken in a vehicle equipped with such equipment. If the test is done in a vehicle equipped with an automatic transmission, a restriction of E will be placed on the license prohibiting the driver from operating a vehicle with a manual transmission. The student driver also needs to show they do in fact show the characteristics of an aware and fully operative driver. This does not exclude certain disabilities; however, standard requirements required by the safety operators must be met.

Employers, training facilities, states, governmental departments, and private institutions may be permitted to administer knowledge and driving test for the state. The test must be the same as those given by the state issuing the CDL, and the instructors must meet the same professional certification as state instructors.

States are required to conduct an inspection of any testing facility and evaluates the programs by taking an actual test as if they were testing driver at least once a year, or by taking a sample of drivers tested by the third party and then comparing pass/fail rates.

In addition, the state's agreement with the third party testing centers must allow the FMCSA and the State to conduct random examinations, inspections, and audits without notice.

Medical certification
In 2014, the law regarding drivers in pursuit of a CDL was modified and requires a DOT medical examiner to authorize a person with a medical issue to be able to drive. Prior to the change, a private doctor was able to authorize a driver to obtain a CDL. Most CMV drivers must prove they are healthy enough to safely drive a truck. A valid medical certificate must be filled out by a medical professional listed on the National Registry of Certified Medical Examiners at the conclusion of an extensive physical exam, with a copy provided to the state Bureau (or Department) of Motor Vehicles compliance unit. Some examples of an impairment which disqualifies a driver include the inability to grasp a steering wheel or operate foot pedals, insulin use, certain cardiac and respiratory problems, markedly elevated blood pressure, epilepsy, some severe psychiatric disorders, certain color blindness, poor corrected vision in either eye (worse than 20/40), bilateral hearing loss, active alcoholism, and other conditions which significantly increase the risk of a medical emergency behind the wheel. See Physical qualifications for drivers page of the Federal Motor Carrier Safety Administration.

Not all medical providers are able to test and complete the medical certification form.

Contents

CDLIS Clearinghouse
The Commercial Driver's License Information System (CDLIS) and the National Driver Register (NDR) exchange information on traffic convictions and driver disqualifications of commercial drivers. States have to use both CDLIS and NDR to check a driver's record before a CDL can be issued. Trucking companies can use a commercial service that has clearance for providing this information as a means of screening prospective employees.

Convictions
Driving without a CDL, or suspended CDL, incurs a civil penalty of up to $2,500 or, in aggravated cases, criminal penalties of up to $5,000 in fines and/or up to 90 days in prison.
A conviction for driving while using an electronic device incurs a $2750 fine for the driver and a $11,000 fine for the employer.
An employer is also subject to a penalty of up to $10,000 if they knowingly permit a driver to operate a CMV without a valid CDL.
Two or more serious traffic violations, including excessive speeding, reckless driving, improper or erratic lane changes, following the vehicle ahead too closely, and traffic offenses in connection with fatal traffic accidents, within a three-year period: a 90-day to five-year suspension.
One or more violations of a Motor vehicle declared out of service order within a 10-year period: one-year suspension.
Driving under the influence of a controlled substance or alcohol, or leaving the scene of an accident, or using a CMV to commit a felony: three-year suspension.
Any of the one-year offenses while operating a CMV for hazardous materials or second offense of any of the one-year or three-year offenses, or using a CMV to commit a felony involving manufacturing, distributing, or dispensing controlled substances: life suspension.

States can reduce certain lifetime disqualifications to a minimum disqualification period of 10 years if the driver completes a driver rehabilitation program approved by the State. Not all states do this: it is available in Idaho and New York State but not California or New Jersey.

If a CDL holder is disqualified from operating a CMV they cannot be issued a "conditional" or "hardship" CDL, but can continue to drive non-commercial vehicles.

Any convictions are reported to the driver's home State and Federal Highway Administration and these convictions are treated the same as convictions for violations that are committed in the home State.

The Commercial Drivers License Program collects and stores all convictions a driver receives and transmits this data to the home State so that any disqualification or suspension can be applied.

The FHWA has established 0.04% as the blood alcohol concentration (BAC) level at or above which a CMV driver is deemed to be driving under the influence of alcohol and subject to lose his/her CDL. Additionally, an operator of a CMV that is found to have 'any detectable amount of BAC above 0.0%' will be put out of service for a minimum of 24 hours.

A driver must report any driving conviction within 30 days, except parking, to their employer regardless of the nature of the violation.

Employers must be notified if a driver's license is suspended, revoked, or canceled. The notification must be made by the end of the next business day following receipt of the notice of the suspension, revocation, cancellation, lost privilege or disqualification.

Employers cannot under any circumstances use a driver who has more than one license or whose license is suspended, revoked or canceled, or is disqualified from driving. Violation of this requirement may result in civil or criminal penalties.

Occupational outlook
The Bureau of Labor Statistics projects a 2% employment growth rate in Heavy and Tractor-trailer Trucking from 2019 to 2029, slower than the average growth rate of 4% across all professions. Scholarships are being awarded to military veterans at CDL-A schools and truck driving companies.

United Kingdom
In the United Kingdom the PCV Licence (PCV stands for Passenger Carrying Vehicle) enables the holder to drive buses and/or minibuses, subject to what kind of Practical Driving Test the licence holder passes.
Category D1 allows the holder to drive a vehicle with between nine and sixteen passenger seats with a trailer up to  maximum authorised mass.
Category D1+E allows the holder to drive a vehicle with between nine and sixteen passenger seats with a trailer over  maximum authorised mass, provided that the maximum authorised mass of the trailer does not exceed the unladen mass of the vehicle being driven and the combined maximum authorised mass of both the vehicle and trailer does not exceed .
Category D allows the holder to drive a vehicle with more than eight passenger seats with a trailer up to  maximum authorised mass.
Category D+E allows the holder to drive a vehicle with more than eight passenger seats with a trailer over  maximum authorised mass.

Australia
All places in Australia have a mostly similar driver licence system, although some things can change in each state or territory (e.g. what classes of license are available).

Australian license classes

C Car: A 'Class C' licence covers vehicles up to  gross vehicle mass (GVM)
GVM is the maximum recommended weight a vehicle can be when loaded. A 'Class C' Licence allows the holder to drive cars, utilities, vans, some light trucks, car-based motor tricycles, tractors and implements such as graders. You can also drive vehicles that seat up to 12 adults, including the driver.

R Rider: Motorcycle riders require a 'Class R' licence.
Any towed trailer must not weigh more than  GVM.
Any towed trailer must not weigh more than  GVM. This class also includes vehicles in class 'LR'.
Any towed trailer must not weigh more than  GVM. This class also includes articulated buses and vehicles in class 'MR'.
This class also includes vehicles in class 'HR'.
MC Multi-Combination: This licence covers multi-combination vehicles like Road Trains and B-Double Vehicles. It also includes vehicles in class 'HC'.

Medical standards
The medical standards for drivers of commercial vehicles are set by the National Transport Commission and Austroads, and are set out in 'Assessing Fitness to Drive' (available from the Austroads website).

For those applying for heavy vehicle licence classes MR (Medium Rigid), HR (Heavy Rigid), HC (Heavy Combination) or MC (Multi Combination), it is strongly recommended that the applicant ensures they meet the medical requirements before commencing any training or tests for a heavy vehicle licence.

Paying passengers
The driver of a vehicle carrying paying passengers (such as a school bus or tourist coach) requires an appropriate driver licence and a 'Public Passenger Vehicle Driver Authority' which is issued by the Ministry of Transport.

New Zealand
In New Zealand, driver licensing is controlled by the NZ Transport Agency. There are six classes of motor-vehicle licence and nine licence endorsements. Class 1 governs vehicles with a GLW (gross laden weight) or GCW (gross combined weight) of less than 6,000 kg, and Class 6 governs motorcycles. Classes 2–5 govern heavy vehicles.

A Class 2 licence allows the holder to drive:
 any rigid vehicle (including any tractor) with a GLW of more than  but less than 
 any rigid vehicle with a GLW of more than  that has no more than two axles
 any vehicle covered in Class 1.

Class 3 allows the holder to drive:
 any combination vehicle with a GCW of more than  but less than 
 any vehicle covered in classes 1 and 2.

Class 4 allows the holder to drive:
 any rigid vehicle (including any tractor) with a GLW of more than 
 vehicles covered in classes 1 and 2, but not Class 3.

Class 5 allows the holder to drive:
 any combination vehicle with a GCW of more than 
 vehicles covered by classes 1, 2, 3 and 4.

Before getting a Class 2 licence, a driver must be at least 18 years of age and have held an unrestricted Class 1 licence for at least six months. Gaining a Class 5 is not dependent on holding a Class 3. Once a driver has a Class 2 they can progress straight through to Class 4 and Class 5. Each progression (2 to 3, 2 to 4, or 4 to 5) requires having held an unrestricted licence of the preceding class for at least six months. For drivers aged 25 or over the minimum period for holding the unrestricted time is reduced to three months, or waived entirely on completion of an approved course of instruction.

Additional endorsements on an NZ driver's licence govern provision of special commercial services. The endorsements are:
D - Dangerous Goods: transporting hazardous substances. Must be renewed every five years
F - Forklift operator
I - Driving Instructor:  An "I" endorsement is awarded for a specific Class of licence, e.g.: 5-I
O - Testing Officer: Driving assessors who test a person prior to being granted a particular class of licence
P - Passenger: Transport of fare-paying passengers (bus and taxi drivers, limo-for-hire drivers, and dial-a-driver services)
R - Roller: Special vehicle equipped with rollers
T - Tracks: Special vehicle equipped with tracks
V - Vehicle recovery: Operating a tow truck
W - Wheels: Special vehicle equipped with wheels, other than fire appliances, buses, tractors, vehicle-recovery vehicles, or trade vehicles.

The F, R, T and W endorsements are for operating special types of vehicle on the road. Where the holder also has a heavy vehicle (Class 2 or Class 4) licence, they are permitted to drive heavy special vehicles. Otherwise the limits for Class 1 apply.

Being granted an I, O, P and/or V endorsement requires that the applicant passes a "fit and proper person" check, to screen for people with criminal convictions or serious driving infringements. These endorsements are issued for one or five years, at the option of the applicant at the time of purchase.

Hong Kong 
In Hong Kong, Transport Department is responsible for issuing driver licences. Private light bus (class 4), public light bus (class 5), taxi (class 6), private bus (class 9), public bus (class 10), franchised public bus (class 17), medium goods vehicle (class 18), heavy goods vehicle (class 19), articulated vehicle (class 20) and special purpose vehicle (class 21) are vehicles requiring commercial driving licences., whereas private car (class 1), light goods vehicle (class 2), motorcycle (class 3), and motor tricycle (class 22) are considered non-commercial vehicles.

To apply for a commercial driving licence, a driver must:
- be of age 21 or above;
- have obtained a private car or light goods vehicle full driving licence for at least 3 years (2 years if converted from probationary licence) immediately before the application;
- be a Hong Kong permanent resident or not subject to any condition of stay other than a limit of stay;
- have not been convicted of some serious driving offences specified in law within 5 years before the application;
and take a driving test of the class of vehicle the driver is going to apply.

In Hong Kong, driving licences are issued separately for each class of vehicle and printed on the licence, although passing a driving test of a heavier vehicle automatically gives the driver the right to apply for corresponding lighter vehicles:
 6 (Taxi) — Only a written test has to be taken, including traffic regulations, taxi regulations and places.
 4 (Private light bus), 5 (Public light bus) — Passenger vehicles with 8 to 19 seats. The driving tests for both are the same, but only class 4 (private light bus) licence can be applied after passing the test. In order to apply for a class 5 (public light bus) licence, a driver has to take an additional Pre-service Training Course for Public Light Bus Drivers before submitting the application
 9 (Private bus), 10 (Public bus) — Passenger vehicles with 20 seats or more. The driving tests for both are the same, and class 4 (private light bus) licence is issued automatically at the same time when applying class 9, 10 licences after passing the test. In addition, class 5 (public light bus) licence can be applied after taking an additional Pre-service Training Course for Public Light Bus Drivers.
 17 (Franchised public bus) — This is obtained through training within a franchised bus company, for example, Kowloon Motor Bus. The driving test requirement is the same with public bus (class 10), and is only retained with historical interest. A driver passing a test on a franchised bus will be issued classes 4, 9, 10 in addition to 17, and 5 after taking an additional Pre-service Training Course for Public Light Bus Drivers, enabling him/her to drive any public buses, whereas a driver holding class 10 (public bus) licence can also drive franchised public bus. Class 17 exists because the government had to protect the interests of franchised bus companies, in the past, drivers trained by a franchised bus company could only get a class 17 licence, enabling him/her to drive franchised public bus only but not other public buses. This has been relaxed such that a driver passing test on a franchised public bus can get classes 9, 10 in addition to class 17, and original drivers holding class 17 without classes 9, 10 can also apply them for free without taking tests.
 18 (Medium goods vehicles) — Goods vehicles with maximum gross weight above  and not exceeding . Class 2 (light goods vehicles) licence is issued in addition to class 18 after passing the test.
 19 (Heavy goods vehicles) — Goods vehicles with maximum gross weight above  and not exceeding . Class 2 (light goods vehicles) and class 18 (medium goods vehicles) licences are issued in addition to class 19 after passing the test.
The driver has to obtain full licence of class 18 (medium goods vehicles) at least before applying. Class 19 (heavy goods vehicles) licence is issued in addition to class 20 after passing the test.
 21 (Special purpose vehicle) — Includes street washing vehicles, arrow vehicles, road maintenance vehicles, ice cream vehicles, etc. A driver has to apply with endorsement from his/her company, and holding a full licence of class 2 (light goods vehicle), 18 (medium goods vehicles) or 19 (heavy goods vehicles). Class 21 licence has to be used in conjunction with a class 2, 18 or 19 licence, allowing the driver to drive special purpose vehicles with maximum gross vehicle weight up to the goods vehicle licence the driver holds.

See also 
 Commercial Driver's License Information System
 Truck classification
 Trucking industry in the United States

References

External links 
 Department of Transportation
 Driver and Vehicle Licensing Agency
 NZTA licensing information page

Identity documents
Traffic law
Driving licences